Moscow City Duma District 15 is one of 45 constituencies in Moscow City Duma. The constituency has covered parts of Eastern Moscow since 2014. From 1993-2005 District 15 was based in Eastern Moscow, but covered more areas to the south of its current configuration; from 2005-2009 the constituency was based in Northern and North-Western Moscow (it actually overlapped the entirety of State Duma Tushino constituency), while from 2009-2014 — in Western Moscow.

Members elected

Election results

2001

|-
! colspan=2 style="background-color:#E9E9E9;text-align:left;vertical-align:top;" |Candidate
! style="background-color:#E9E9E9;text-align:left;vertical-align:top;" |Party
! style="background-color:#E9E9E9;text-align:right;" |Votes
! style="background-color:#E9E9E9;text-align:right;" |%
|-
|style="background-color:"|
|align=left|Vera Stepanenko
|align=left|Yabloko
|
|28.25%
|-
|style="background-color:"|
|align=left|Aleksey Chesnokov
|align=left|Independent
|
|21.01%
|-
|style="background-color:"|
|align=left|Aleksandr Bulgakov
|align=left|Independent
|
|13.57%
|-
|style="background-color:"|
|align=left|Igor Antonov
|align=left|Independent
|
|11.65%
|-
|style="background-color:"|
|align=left|Konstantin Glodev
|align=left|Independent
|
|5.88%
|-
|style="background-color:#000000"|
|colspan=2 |against all
|
|14.91%
|-
| colspan="5" style="background-color:#E9E9E9;"|
|- style="font-weight:bold"
| colspan="3" style="text-align:left;" | Total
| 
| 100%
|-
| colspan="5" style="background-color:#E9E9E9;"|
|- style="font-weight:bold"
| colspan="4" |Source:
|
|}

2005

|-
! colspan=2 style="background-color:#E9E9E9;text-align:left;vertical-align:top;" |Candidate
! style="background-color:#E9E9E9;text-align:left;vertical-align:top;" |Party
! style="background-color:#E9E9E9;text-align:right;" |Votes
! style="background-color:#E9E9E9;text-align:right;" |%
|-
|style="background-color:"|
|align=left|Valery Skobinov (incumbent)
|align=left|United Russia
|
|51.07%
|-
|style="background-color:"|
|align=left|Aleksandr Krutov
|align=left|Communist Party
|
|14.47%
|-
|style="background-color:"|
|align=left|Andrey Bocharnikov
|align=left|Rodina
|
|13.24%
|-
|style="background-color:"|
|align=left|Andrey Sotnikov
|align=left|Liberal Democratic Party
|
|5.13%
|-
|style="background-color:"|
|align=left|Anatoly Babanov
|align=left|Independent
|
|4.61%
|-
|style="background-color:"|
|align=left|Viktor Vdovkin
|align=left|Russian Party of Life
|
|4.22%
|-
|style="background-color:"|
|align=left|Valery Kubarev
|align=left|Independent
|
|2.00%
|-
| colspan="5" style="background-color:#E9E9E9;"|
|- style="font-weight:bold"
| colspan="3" style="text-align:left;" | Total
| 
| 100%
|-
| colspan="5" style="background-color:#E9E9E9;"|
|- style="font-weight:bold"
| colspan="4" |Source:
|
|}

2009

|-
! colspan=2 style="background-color:#E9E9E9;text-align:left;vertical-align:top;" |Candidate
! style="background-color:#E9E9E9;text-align:left;vertical-align:top;" |Party
! style="background-color:#E9E9E9;text-align:right;" |Votes
! style="background-color:#E9E9E9;text-align:right;" |%
|-
|style="background-color:"|
|align=left|Aleksandr Milyavsky
|align=left|United Russia
|
|71.08%
|-
|style="background-color:"|
|align=left|Yury Novikov
|align=left|Communist Party
|
|16.56%
|-
|style="background-color:"|
|align=left|Vladimir Borshchev
|align=left|Liberal Democratic Party
|
|8.08%
|-
| colspan="5" style="background-color:#E9E9E9;"|
|- style="font-weight:bold"
| colspan="3" style="text-align:left;" | Total
| 
| 100%
|-
| colspan="5" style="background-color:#E9E9E9;"|
|- style="font-weight:bold"
| colspan="4" |Source:
|
|}

2014

|-
! colspan=2 style="background-color:#E9E9E9;text-align:left;vertical-align:top;" |Candidate
! style="background-color:#E9E9E9;text-align:left;vertical-align:top;" |Party
! style="background-color:#E9E9E9;text-align:right;" |Votes
! style="background-color:#E9E9E9;text-align:right;" |%
|-
|style="background-color:"|
|align=left|Andrey Metelsky (incumbent)
|align=left|United Russia
|
|53.43%
|-
|style="background-color:"|
|align=left|Maksim Timonin
|align=left|Communist Party
|
|14.08%
|-
|style="background-color:"|
|align=left|Aleksey Krapukhin
|align=left|Yabloko
|
|12.01%
|-
|style="background-color:"|
|align=left|Stanislav Shilov
|align=left|Independent
|
|6.77%
|-
|style="background-color:"|
|align=left|Vyacheslav Dushenko
|align=left|A Just Russia
|
|5.66%
|-
|style="background-color:"|
|align=left|Mikhail Yuryev
|align=left|Liberal Democratic Party
|
|4.48%
|-
| colspan="5" style="background-color:#E9E9E9;"|
|- style="font-weight:bold"
| colspan="3" style="text-align:left;" | Total
| 
| 100%
|-
| colspan="5" style="background-color:#E9E9E9;"|
|- style="font-weight:bold"
| colspan="4" |Source:
|
|}

2019

|-
! colspan=2 style="background-color:#E9E9E9;text-align:left;vertical-align:top;" |Candidate
! style="background-color:#E9E9E9;text-align:left;vertical-align:top;" |Party
! style="background-color:#E9E9E9;text-align:right;" |Votes
! style="background-color:#E9E9E9;text-align:right;" |%
|-
|style="background-color:"|
|align=left|Sergey Sevostyanov
|align=left|Communist Party
|
|42.16%
|-
|style="background-color:"|
|align=left|Andrey Metelsky (incumbent)
|align=left|Independent
|
|31.86%
|-
|style="background-color:"|
|align=left|Aleksey Kustov
|align=left|Liberal Democratic Party
|
|9.15%
|-
|style="background-color:"|
|align=left|Yury Vostokov
|align=left|Independent
|
|6.80%
|-
|style="background-color:"|
|align=left|Ivan Ostrikov
|align=left|Communists of Russia
|
|5.85%
|-
| colspan="5" style="background-color:#E9E9E9;"|
|- style="font-weight:bold"
| colspan="3" style="text-align:left;" | Total
| 
| 100%
|-
| colspan="5" style="background-color:#E9E9E9;"|
|- style="font-weight:bold"
| colspan="4" |Source:
|
|}

Notes

References

Moscow City Duma districts